Seda Poshteh (also Romanized as Şedā Poshteh) is a village in Rudboneh Rural District, Rudboneh District, Lahijan County, Gilan Province, Iran. At the 2006 census, its population was 447, in 151 families.

References 

Populated places in Lahijan County